Nasusina vaporata is a moth in the family Geometridae first described by Pearsall in 1912. It is found in the United States in southern California, Nevada and probably Arizona.

The wingspan is 13–14 mm. Adults have been recorded on wing from April to June.

References

Moths described in 2004
Eupitheciini